Mount Harker is a mountain peak located east of Willis Glacier in the Saint Johns Range, Victoria Land, Antarctica.  The mountain was first mapped by the Terra Nova Expedition (1910–1913) led by Robert Falcon Scott.  The mountain is named for Alfred Harker (1859–1939), an English geologist who specialised in petrology and petrography.

External links
Australian Antarctic Data Centre Antarctic Gazeteer entry for Mount Harker.
Consorzio PNRA Composite Gazeteer of Antarctica entry for Mount Harker.

Cited references

Mountains of Victoria Land
Scott Coast